Light Blue is a fragrance line by Italian fashion designers Dolce & Gabbana which was launched in 2001 and has won numerous fragrance-industry awards. The men's version (Light Blue Pour Homme) was released in 2007 and has also won awards, including the FiFi Awards in 2008.

Starting in 2012, limited-edition versions for women and men have been released periodically. These fragrances have been launched with photoshoots rather than with traditional advertising campaigns and have featured the same male and female models as the original scents.

Background
The Italian design duo, Domenico Dolce and Stefano Gabbana, contracted with perfumer Olivier Cresp to develop a fragrance inspired by Sicily. The process took over two years to perfect and the women's fragrance was released in 2001.

Original range

Light Blue
For the original fragrance for women, Cresp married a tart Granny Smith apple (synthetics cis-3 Hexenol, Liffarome and cis-3 hexenyl acetate) to Delta Muscenone (the scent of human skin). The fragrance includes three synthetic woods (Z11, Ambrox and Norlimbanol) as well as natural cedars. It contains approximately 15 percent of natural Sicilian lemon-peel essence. Top notes: Sicilian Cedar, apple, bluebell; middle notes: bamboo, jasmine, white rose; and base notes: Citron wood, amber and musk.

Light Blue Pour Homme
The men's fragrance was released in 2007 to immediate acclaim. It is characterized as a fresh classic balanced fragrance which is described as light-hearted, sparkling, and sophisticated. The fragrance is considered to be a woody spicy fragrance and consists of numerous notes including Sicilian Mandarin, frozen grape fruit peel, Russian pepper, rosemary, Sichuan pepper, rosewood, American musk wood, incense, and oak moss.

Limited editions

Light Blue Dreaming in Portofino
A limited edition, released in 2012, this women's fragrance is named for the fishing village and resort of the rich and famous on the Italian Riviera. The notes include Citrus Accord, pink pepper, Crisp Aquatic, geranium, amber and patchouli.

Light Blue Living Stromboli
Named for the volcanic island, the limited edition men's fragrance (released in 2012) has received generally positive reviews. It has been described as a woody, aquatic scent that begins with notes of citruses and red pepper. The mid-notes include marine accords and geranium, while the base is composed of mossy vetiver, earthy patchouli, and amber.

Light Blue Escape To Panarea
Escape to Panarea is a 2014 limited edition women's fragrance inspired by the small island of Panarea that belongs to the Aeolian Islands. The island is a popular destination for international guests. The fragrance conveys the atmosphere and scents of the Aoles with accords pear and bergamot combined with night-blooming jasmine petals and a bouquet of orange blossom.

Light Blue Discover Volcano
Inspired by an exploding volcanic island, Discover Vulcano is a 2014 limited edition men's fragrance that belongs to the woody-chypre olfactive family. This fragrance opens with intense top notes of Italian lemon with ginger, followed by the grassy undertones of cypress and lavender. Haitian vetiver, cedar wood, and the musky-amber scent of ambrox blend to provide the base notes.

Light Blue Sunset in Salina
The 2015 limited edition floral fragrance was inspired by the Mediterranean summer and its clear blue waters. Sunset in Salina opens with fresh vines and bright violet leaves, followed by yellow freesia, orange flower and jasmine. The base combines amber, cedarwood and white musk.

Light Blue Swimming in Lipari
For 2015, the limited edition for men was inspired by the Aeolian Islands (off the coast of Sicily) that feature a rugged volcanic archipelago surrounded by crystal waters. The fragrance opens with hints of sea salt enhanced by grapefruit while the heart combines mandarin and rosemary. Dry woods, ambergris and musky notes end the composition.

Reception
In The New York Times in 2007, Light Blue for women earned a 5 (out of 5) star rating. In 2008, Light Blue for Men won the best men's fragrance as well as best new fragrance commercial at the FiFi Awards. , the Light Blue fragrances had received fourteen awards. Light Blue was one of twelve fragrances selected for an exhibition entitled "The Art of Scent 1889-2012" curated by Chandler Burr, head of the Department of Olfactory Art of the Museum of Arts and Design. The Fragrance Foundation announced that both the male and female fragrances were in the top 7 selling fragrances for the first quarter of 2015.

Advertising
The initial advert for the fragrance was filmed in 2007 in Capri, Italy with models David Gandy and Marija Vujović wearing tiny white swimsuits and kissing on a raft. The voice is the one of the French voice over actor Pierre Maubouché, who also voiced the subsequent TV commercials, also aired worldwide. According to British researchers, the advertisement is among the sexiest television adverts.

In 2010, the adverts featured Gandy with model Anna Jagodzińska. Instead of the raft, the models are seen in tiny white suits before swimming to shore where they embrace. Both versions of the advertisements were shot by fashion photographer Mario Testino in the waters off the island of Capri.

In May 2013, Dolce & Gabbana released their third version of the “Light Blue” fragrance campaign. Testino again filmed the commercials and adverts on location in Capri but this time with Italian model Bianca Balti in the female role opposite Gandy. In 2015, InStyle magazine included Light Blue as one of 'The 10 Hottest Perfume Campaigns'.

Balti and Gandy participated in a photoshoot in support of the 2015 limited versions with photographer Victor Demarchelier.

References

Perfumes
Dolce & Gabbana
Designer perfumes
21st-century perfumes